Agyneta conigera is a species of sheet weaver found in the Palearctic and Congo. It was described by O.P.-Cambridge in 1863.

References

conigera
Spiders of Africa
Palearctic spiders
Spiders described in 1863